Buchanan is an unincorporated community in Pebble Township, Pike County, Ohio, United States.  it shares nearby Waverly, Ohio's ZIP code 45690.  It lies along State Route 772.

The community was named after James Buchanan, 15th President of the United States.

Gallery

References

Unincorporated communities in Ohio
Unincorporated communities in Pike County, Ohio